The Graduate Faculty Philosophy Journal is an academic journal sponsored by the philosophy department of The New School in New York City. The focus of this journal is recent European work in phenomenology, hermeneutics, critical theory, and the history of philosophy. The journal is edited by a committee of graduate philosophy students at The New School. It is published twice yearly on a non-profit basis in cooperation with the Philosophy Documentation Center. All issues are available online.

See also 
 List of philosophy journals

External links 
 

Biannual journals
English-language journals
Philosophy journals
Publications established in 1972
Philosophy Documentation Center academic journals
Continental philosophy